Mimacraea darwinia, the common acraea mimic, is a butterfly in the family Lycaenidae. It is found in Sierra Leone, Liberia, Ivory Coast, Ghana, Nigeria, Cameroon, Gabon and possibly the western part of the Democratic Republic of the Congo. The habitat consists of forests.

Adult males mimic Bematistes epaea.

References

Butterflies described in 1872
Poritiinae
Butterflies of Africa
Taxa named by Arthur Gardiner Butler